The 2008-09 Primera División season was the 118th season of top-flight professional football in Argentina and the nineteenth season in which the Apertura and Clausura system is used.

Boca Juniors won the Apertura championship for their 29th national title after a three team playoff with Tigre and San Lorenzo. The Clausura championship was won by Vélez Sársfield for their 7th national title. Gimnasia y Esgrima (J) and San Martín (T) were relegated to the Primera B Nacional.

Format
The format for the 2008-09 season remained unchanged. The season was split into two tournaments called Apertura and Clausura. Each tournament was contested by the same 20 teams in a single round-robin format. The champions of each tournament is determined by points. If the tops teams would be tied at points at the end of each tournament, a playoff would be held at a neutral site. Relegation was determined at the end of the season.

Club information

Promotion and relegation
Olimpo and San Martín (SJ) were relegated at the end of the 2007–08 Primera División season. They were replaced by Godoy Cruz and San Martín (T), both of whom were promoted from the Primera B Nacional.

Gimnasia y Esgrima (J) and Racing played the relegation/promotion playoffs against Unión and Belgrano, respectively. Both Gimnasia and Esgrima (J) and Racing won their playoff matches and retained their status in top-flight football.

Personnel

Managerial changes

Transfers

Torneo Apertura
The Torneo Apertura was played between August 6 to December 14, 2008.  The champions earned a spot in the 2009 Copa Libertadores.

Standings

Results

Championship playoff 
Since San Lorenzo, Tigre and Boca Juniors ended the tournament with the same number of points, a three-way playoff was played to determine the champions.

Top Goalscorers

Source: Scorer Stats

Torneo Clausura
The Torneo Clausura began on February 6, 2009 and ended on July 5, 2009. The champions earned a spot in the 2010 Copa Libertadores.

Standings

Results

Top Goalscorers

Source: AFA

Relegation
Relegation from the Primera Division was determined on the basis of performance over the last three seasons. Every club had its points earned divided by the number of matches played and an average was determined. The clubs who finished in 17th and 18th played a relegation play-off against the 3rd and 4th placed clubs in Primera B Nacional. The clubs who finished in 19th and 20th were directly relegated to Primera B Nacional.

Source:AFA

Relegation/promotion playoffs

|-
!colspan="5"|Relegation/promotion playoff 1

|-
!colspan="5"|Relegation/promotion playoff 2

Gimnasia y Esgrima (LP) remained in the Argentine First Division after a 3–3 aggregate tie by virtue of a "sports advantage". In case of a tie in goals, the team from the First Division gets to stay in it.
Rosario Central won 2–1 and stayed in the Argentine First Division, while Belgrano does not get promoted and remains in Argentine Nacional B.

International qualification

Copa Libertadores
The Apertura champions qualified for the 2009 Copa Libertadores and the Clausura champions qualified to the 2010 Copa Libertadores. The last two Argentina spots for the 2009 Copa Libertadores were determined by the sum of all points obtained in the past three tournaments.

Copa Sudamericana
Qualification for the 2009 Copa Sudamericana was determined from an aggregate table of the Apertura and Clausura tournaments. The top four teams in the aggregate table qualified; Boca Juniors and River Plate were invited every year till this season, regardless of their standings in the season.

See also
2008–09 in Argentine football

External links
Asociación del Fútbol Argentino (AFA) website 
Season regulations 

1
Argentine Primera División seasons
p
p